Luca Cognigni (born 23 March 1991) is an Italian footballer who plays as a forward for  club Legnago.

Club career
He made his Serie B debut for Ascoli on 7 November 2009 in a game against Cittadella.

On 7 June 2018, Fermana announced that Cognigni had signed a new contract, keeping him at the club until 2020. On 17 January 2019, he joined Siracusa on loan.

On 26 July 2022, Cognigni moved to Legnago in Serie D.

References

External links
 
 

1991 births
Sportspeople from Ancona
Footballers from Marche
Living people
Italian footballers
Association football forwards
Serie B players
Serie C players
Lega Pro Seconda Divisione players
Serie D players
Eccellenza players
Ascoli Calcio 1898 F.C. players
A.C. Mezzocorona players
Paganese Calcio 1926 players
A.C. Carpi players
A.C. Ancona players
Fermana F.C. players
Siracusa Calcio players
F.C. Legnago Salus players